Torben Rechendorff (1 April 1937 – 28 November 2022) was a Danish teacher and politician. A member of the Conservative People's Party, he served as Minister for Ecclesiastical Affairs from 1988 to 1993 and was a member of the Folketing from 1990 to 1998.

Rechendorff died on 28 November 2022, at the age of 85.

References

1937 births
2022 deaths
Danish educators
Danish Ministers for Ecclesiastical Affairs
Members of the Folketing
Conservative People's Party (Denmark) politicians
People from Copenhagen